The 1995–96 Buffalo Sabres season was the Sabres' 26th season in the National Hockey League. This was the team's final season at Buffalo Memorial Auditorium, their home arena since 1970. They moved to Marine Midland Arena, which is now known as the KeyBank Center. However, the Sabres failed to qualify for the playoffs for the first time since 1987.

Offseason

Regular season
The Sabres had the most power-play opportunities during the regular season with 477.

Season standings

Schedule and results

Player statistics

Regular season
Scoring

Goaltending

Note: Pos = Position; GP = Games played; G = Goals; A = Assists; Pts = Points; +/- = plus/minus; PIM = Penalty minutes; PPG = Power-play goals; SHG = Short-handed goals; GWG = Game-winning goals
      MIN = Minutes played; W = Wins; L = Losses; T = Ties; GA = Goals-against; GAA = Goals-against average; SO = Shutouts; SA = Shots against; SV = Shots saved; SV% = Save percentage;

Awards and records
NHL All-Star Game
 Dominik Hasek, Eastern Conference

Transactions

Draft picks
Buffalo's draft picks at the 1995 NHL Entry Draft held at the Edmonton Coliseum in Edmonton, Alberta.

See also
 1995–96 NHL season

References
 Sabres on Hockey Database

Buffalo Sabres seasons
B
B
Buffalo
Buffalo